Chain girth is a measurement of a yacht hull.

Chain girth is specified in some design rules  to handicap or match the capabilities of sailing vessels of similar design such as the 12 metre boats. Chain girth is measured as a straight line from a given elevation on the hull near the waterline vertically from a specified fore-and-aft position and diagonally as viewed from the bow to a point on the hull near the keel.  It differs from the skin girth which is measured following the surface of the hull.

External links
 Current Class Rules for 2.4M boats - note appendix section H

Nautical terminology